Adavivaram is a neighborhood situated on the western part of Visakhapatnam City, India. The area, which falls under the local administrative limits of Greater Visakhapatnam Municipal Corporation, is about 15 km from the Dwaraka Nagar which is city centre. Adavivaram is located at the foothill of Simhachalam temple and is served by the Visakhapatnam Bus Rapid Transit System.

Transport
APSRTC routes

References

Neighbourhoods in Visakhapatnam